is a Japanese sports shooter. He competed in the men's 10 metre air rifle event at the 2016 Summer Olympics.

References

External links
 

1990 births
Living people
Japanese male sport shooters
Olympic shooters of Japan
Shooters at the 2016 Summer Olympics
Place of birth missing (living people)
Shooters at the 2018 Asian Games
Asian Games competitors for Japan
Shooters at the 2020 Summer Olympics
21st-century Japanese people